Gellénháza is a village in Zala County, Hungary.

See also
Gellénháza Power Plant

References

External links 
 Official website of Gellénháza 

Populated places in Zala County